János Molnár is a former international table tennis player from Hungary.

He won a bronze medal at the 1983 World Table Tennis Championships in the Swaythling Cup (men's team event) with Gábor Gergely, István Jónyer, Zsolt Kriston and Zoltán Káposztás for Hungary.

He also won a European Table Tennis Championships gold medal in 1982.

See also
 List of table tennis players
 List of World Table Tennis Championships medalists

References

Hungarian male table tennis players
Living people
World Table Tennis Championships medalists
Year of birth missing (living people)
20th-century Hungarian people